Jay Hawk Talk is the third studio album by trumpeter Carmell Jones. Recorded and released in 1965, it was Jones' debut on Prestige and his final album as a leader.

Track listing
All compositions by Carmell Jones, unless otherwise noted
"Jay Hawk Talk" - 5:51
"Willow Weep for Me" (Ann Ronell) - 4:57
"What Is This Thing Called Love?" (Cole Porter) - 8:57
"Just in Time" (Jules Styne, Betty Comden, Adolph Green) - 5:34
"Dance of the Night Child" - 6:38
"Beepdurple" - 6:18

Personnel
Carmell Jones - trumpet
Jimmy Heath - tenor saxophone
Barry Harris - piano
George Tucker - bass
Roger Humphries - drums

References

1965 albums
Prestige Records albums
Albums produced by Don Schlitten